Mohamad Siraj Tamim (born June 2, 1985 in Beirut) is a Lebanese athlete. Tamim competed in the 200 meters at the 2008 Summer Olympics, he recorded a time of 21.80 but failed to qualify for the second round.

External links
 Mohamad Tamim - IAAF.org Profile

1985 births
Living people
Lebanese male sprinters
Athletes (track and field) at the 2008 Summer Olympics
Olympic athletes of Lebanon
Sportspeople from Beirut
21st-century Lebanese people